Ri Kyong-sok (born 14 August 1981) is a North Korean weightlifter. He competed at the 2008 Summer Olympics.

References

Living people
North Korean male weightlifters
Olympic weightlifters of North Korea
Weightlifters at the 2008 Summer Olympics
Weightlifters at the 2006 Asian Games
1981 births
Asian Games competitors for North Korea
21st-century North Korean people